On The Real was a radio show on the Air America network hosted by Gia'na Garel and Chuck D.

The program included commentary from the hosts on current events, and interviews with various artists in the music and entertainment industry.

The show started on June 5, 2005 and aired every Sunday at 11pm EST - 1am EST.

Air America (radio network)
American talk radio programs